The 2016 NCAA Division I baseball tournament began on Friday, June 3, 2016, as part of the 2016 NCAA Division I baseball season.  The 64-team, double-elimination tournament concluded with the 2016 College World Series (CWS) in Omaha, Nebraska, starting on June 18, 2016, and ending on June 30, 2016. The 64 participating NCAA Division I college baseball teams were selected out of 298 eligible teams. Thirty-one teams were awarded an automatic bid, as champions of their conferences; the remaining 33 teams were selected at-large by the NCAA Division I Baseball Committee.

Teams were divided into sixteen regionals of four teams, which conducted a double-elimination tournament. Regional champions faced each other in Super Regionals, a best-of-three-game series to determine the eight participants of the College World Series. The Atlantic Coast Conference (ACC) set a conference record and tied the all-time mark of having ten teams in the championship field. A tournament-high seven regional hosts came from the Southeastern Conference (SEC), followed by six of the ten ACC schools; however, only Miami (ACC) and Florida (SEC) advanced to Omaha, and they were the first and second teams eliminated, respectively.  For the first time since the tournament expanded from 48 teams in 1999, the NCAA did not select any Pac-12 schools to host a regional, and Lubbock, Texas, (Texas Tech) was the westernmost regional host city picked by the selection committee.

In the CWS after Texas Tech lost to Big 12 rival TCU, none of the three national seeds who had reached Omaha had won their opening game. Tech eventually became the fourth team to be eliminated. While Oklahoma State and TCU advanced through the winners' bracket to set up a possible all–Big 12 championship, Arizona and Coastal Carolina won both elimination games to advance to the best-of-three final series.

With each team winning a game in the championship series to force a winner-take-all Game 3, the tournament reached the maximum of 17 games for the first time; the finals expanded in 2003 to a best-of-three format as opposed to a single, winner-take-all championship game. Coastal Carolina won the deciding game, 4–3, becoming the first team since 1956 to win the title in its first CWS appearance. Coastal Carolina won six elimination games in NCAA post-season play – one in a Regional, three in the CWS double-elimination bracket, and two in the Championship Series. The runner-up, Arizona, won six elimination games – three in a Regional and three in the CWS double-elimination bracket, but lost their 7th, the last game of the Championship Series.

Bids

Automatic bids

By conference

National seeds
The following eight teams automatically host a Super Regional if they advance to that round:
Florida
 ‡
Miami (FL)
Texas A&M ‡
Texas Tech
Mississippi State ‡
Clemson †
 ‡

Bold indicates College World Series participant
† indicates teams that were eliminated in the Regional Tournament
‡ indicates teams that were eliminated in the Super Regional Tournament

Regionals and Super Regionals
Bold indicates winner.  Seeds for regional tournaments indicate seeds within regional.  Seeds for super regional tournaments indicate national seeds only.

Gainesville Super Regional

Baton Rouge Super Regional

College Station Super Regional

Lubbock Super Regional

Coral Gables Super Regional

Starkville Super Regional

Louisville Super Regional

Columbia Super Regional

College World Series
The College World Series was held at TD Ameritrade Park in Omaha, Nebraska.

Participants

Bracket
Seeds listed below indicate national seeds only

Game results

All-Tournament Team
The following players were members of the College World Series All-Tournament Team.

Final standings
Seeds listed below indicate national seeds only

Record by conference

The columns RF, SR, WS, NS, CS, and NC respectively stand for the Regional Finals, Super Regionals, College World Series, National Semifinals, Championship Series, and National Champion.

Nc is non–conference records, i.e., with the records of teams within the same conference having played each other removed.

Media coverage

Radio
NRG Media provided nationwide radio coverage of the College World Series through its Omaha station KOZN, in association with Westwood One. It was streamed at  westwoodonesports.com  and on TuneIn. Kevin Kugler and John Bishop called all games leading up to the Championship Series with Gary Sharp acting as the field reporter. The Championship Series was called by Kugler (Gms 1–2), Bishop (Gm 3), and Scott Graham. Ted Emrich acted as field reporter for Games 1 & 2.

Television
ESPN carried every game from the Regionals, Super Regionals, and College World Series across its networks. During the Regionals, ESPN offered a dedicated channel, ESPN Bases Loaded (carried in the same channel allotments as its "Goal Line" and "Buzzer Beater" services for football and basketball), which carried live look-ins and analysis across all games in progress, hosted by Brendan Fitzgerald and Matt Schick with Kyle Peterson providing analysis.

The final game of the tournament aired on ESPNU, as the NCAA scheduled the game for an afternoon start, and there were scheduling conflicts with ESPN and ESPN2 due to UEFA Euro 2016 and the 2016 Wimbledon Championships.

Broadcast assignments

Regionals
Mike Morgan and Carlos Peña: Gainesville, Florida
Trey Bender and Jerry Kindall: Tallahassee, Florida
Steve Lenox and Wes Clements: Raleigh, North Carolina
Lyn Rollins and Ben McDonald: Baton Rouge, Louisiana
Mark Neely and Greg Swindell: Lubbock, Texas
Taylor Zarzour and Nick Belmonte: Charlottesville, Virginia
Roxy Bernstein and Keith Moreland: Fort Worth, Texas
Clay Matvick and Gabe Gross: College Station, Texas
Super Regionals
Dave Neal, Chris Burke, and Kaylee Hartung: Gainesville, Florida
Mike Couzens and Nick Belmonte: Baton Rouge, Louisiana
Roxy Bernstein and Wes Clements: Lubbock, Texas
Tom Hart, Kyle Peterson, and Laura Rutledge: College Station, Texas
College World Series
Jon Sciambi, Alex Cora, Dallas Braden or Kyle Peterson, and Kaylee Hartung (select): Afternoons, Wed night
Karl Ravech, Eduardo Pérez, Kyle Peterson, and Kaylee Hartung: Evenings minus Wed

Regionals
Dave Neal and Chris Burke: Louisville, Kentucky
Mike Keith and Rusty Ensor: Nashville, Tennessee
Matt Stewart and Jay Walker: Columbia, South Carolina
Tom Hart and Mike Rooney: Clemson, South Carolina
Doug Sherman and John Gregory: Starkville, Mississippi
Brett Dolan and Tom Holliday: Lafayette, Louisiana
Richard Cross and David Dellucci: Oxford, Mississippi
Anish Shroff and Alex Cora: Miami, Florida
Super Regionals
Mike Morgan and Mike Rooney: Louisville, Kentucky
Mark Neely and Todd Walker: Columbia, South Carolina
Clay Matvick and Ben McDonald: Starkville, Mississippi
Anish Shroff and Alex Cora: Miami, Florida
College World Series Championship Series
Karl Ravech, Eduardo Pérez, Kyle Peterson, Kaylee Hartung, and Alex Cora

References

NCAA Division I Baseball Championship
Tournament
College World Series
Baseball in the Dallas–Fort Worth metroplex
Baseball competitions in Nebraska
Sports competitions in Lubbock, Texas
Baseball competitions in Texas